James Thomas Waggoner Jr. (born January 8, 1937) is an American politician who is a Republican member of the Alabama Senate, representing the 16th District since 1990. Waggoner was born on January 8, 1937. He received his B.A. from Birmingham Southern College and his J.D. from the Birmingham School of Law.

Personal life 
Waggoner is the son of former Birmingham City Commissioner J. T. Waggoner and an Ensley elementary school teacher. He graduated from Ensley High School and earned his B.A. from Birmingham-Southern College and his J.D. from Birmingham School of Law. Law school inspired him to enter politics.

Waggoner lives in Vestavia Hills with his wife, Marilyn, and attends Homewood Church of Christ. They had four children, Scott, Mark, Lyn and J. T. III ("Jay"), who was a standout member of the Auburn Tigers baseball team.

Waggoner is president of Birmingham Business Consultants, LLC. He serves on the boards for United Cerebral Palsy, the Metropolitan Development Board, Better Business Bureau, Greater Birmingham Convention and Visitors Bureau, Alabama Sports Hall of Fame, and Pinnacle Bank. He served as head coach of the Birmingham Touchdown Club and was president of the Birmingham Tip-Off Club.

Career
He assumed office in the Alabama State Senate in 1990. He was the Minority Leader from 1999 until the Republicans gained a legislative majority in November 2010 for the first time since Reconstruction, upon which he became Majority Leader. Previously he was a member of the Alabama House of Representatives from 1966 to 1983 as a Democrat. He switched parties the following year to run unsuccessfully against U.S. Congressman Ben Erdreich in the Birmingham-based 6th district in 1984, receiving 40%.

In May 2019, he voted to make abortion a crime at any stage in a pregnancy, with no exemptions for cases of rape or incest.

In the State Legislature's 2021-2022 session, Waggoner was assigned to the following committees:

 Legislative Committee on Public Accounts
 Transportation Committee
 Banking and Insurance Committee
 Confirmations Committee, Vice Chair
 Finance and Taxation Education Committee
 Finance and Taxation General Fund Committee
 Local Legislation Jefferson County Committee, Chair
 Local Legislation Shelby County Committee
 Senate Rules Committee, Chair

References

External links
 Project Vote Smart – Senator J.T. 'Jabo' Waggoner (AL) profile
 Follow the Money – J T (Jabo) Waggoner
 2006 2002 1998 campaign

1937 births
Republican Party Alabama state senators
American members of the Churches of Christ
Living people
Republican Party members of the Alabama House of Representatives
People from Vestavia Hills, Alabama
2012 United States presidential electors
21st-century American politicians